John Fogg is an American politician who served as the mayor of Pensacola, Florida, from 1994 to 2009. Fogg was appointed to the post by the Pensacola City Council in 1994, and reappointed in 1995, 1997, and 1999. In 2001, he became the first elected mayor since 1913.

Early life and education
Fogg has a master's degree in public administration from Troy State University and a Bachelor of Arts degree in psychology from Butler University.

Career 
He was a member of the United States Marine Corps and flew 200 combat air missions in Vietnam. He was also awarded 14 Combat Air Medals, a Blue Angels demonstration pilot from 1973 to 1974, "Top Gun" graduate of Navy Fighter Weapons School, the commanding officer of Marine Fighter Attack Squadron VMFA-122, and was awarded the Meritorious Service Medal upon retirement as a lieutenant colonel after 20 years of service.

Post-mayoralty life
Five years after his mayoral tenure, Fogg published "By the Grace of God," in which he chronicled his near-death experiences in the context of his Christian spiritual growth.

See also
List of mayors of Pensacola, Florida

References

Official profile

1944 births
Living people
Mayors of Pensacola, Florida
United States Marine Corps personnel of the Vietnam War
United States Naval Aviators
Butler University alumni
United States Marine Corps officers